The Pegnitz is a river in Franconia in the German state of Bavaria.

The Fichtenohe source is in Lindenhardt Forest north of Pegnitz town.

The river is inhabited by numerous ducks, coots, swans, and gulls.

Tributaries
 Fichtenohe (left tributary)
 Flembach (left tributary)
 Hirschbach (left tributary)
 Högenbach (left tributary from the Pommelsbrunn direction)
 Happurger Bach (left tributary)
 Sittenbach (right tributary)
 Hammerbach (left tributary)
 Sandbach (left tributary)
 Schnaittach (right tributary)
 Röttenbach (right tributary)
 Bitterbach (right tributary)
 Röthenbach (left tributary)
 Langwassergraben (right tributary)
 Tiefgraben (right tributary)
 Goldbach (left tributary)

Cities on the Pegnitz

From source to mouth:

 Pegnitz
 Neuhaus on the Pegnitz
 Hersbruck
 Lauf an der Pegnitz
 Röthenbach an der Pegnitz
 Nuremberg: Within city limits (about 14 km), the river forms secondary arms. Numerous bridges and footbridges cross the river, such as the unchanged Renaissance bridge Fleischbrücke (1598) and the iron suspension bridge Chain Bridge (Kettensteg), dating from 1824. To the west of the Maxbrücke there is a weir. In the western part of the city, the river's ecological status was restored one section at a time from 1998 to 2001, using the historical river bed as an orientation.
 Fürth: Numerous bridges and footbridges exist. As part of project Uferstadt (riverside city), the redesign of the former Grundig site, the river bed was restored to being closer to nature in 2003. On a length of one kilometer, two new loops and shallowed banks have been created, and part of the former river bed have been kept in the form of backwaters. These activities were cofinanced by the European Union.

History

The river gives its name to the Pegnesischer Blumenorden (Pegnitz Flower Society) literary association.

After the big flood in February 1909, straightening has shortened the river by four kilometers within the Nuremberg city limits.

Since 1996 planning and actions are progressing trying to lengthen the course of the river between Nuremberg and Fürth again and to shape it in a nature-oriented way.

See also
List of rivers of Bavaria

References

External links

  http://www.bayern.de/wwa-n/stadtamfluss.htm - Wasserwirtschaftsamt Nürnberg: "Die Umgestaltung der Pegnitz in Nürnberg"

Rivers of Bavaria
Nürnberger Land
Nuremberg
Fürth
Bayreuth (district)
Rivers of Germany